X Factor is an Italian television music competition to find new singing talent; the winner receives a recording contract with Sony Music. Fedez and Manuel Agnelli have been as judges and mentors, Mara Maionchi is returned, also Alessandro Cattelan was confirmed as host. The twelfth season was aired on Sky Uno and TV8 since September 2018. Asia Argento was part of the season line up but was subsequently removed following sexual abuse allegations Lodovico Guenzi replaced her in the live shows.

Judges' houses
The "Home Visit" is the final phase before the Live Shows. In this phase, the contestants who passed the "Bootcamp" had to perform one last time in front of their specific judge, in four different locations. At the end of this audition, the top twelve contestants were chosen.

The eight eliminated acts were:
Boys: Leonardo Parmeggiani, Pierfrancesco "Pjero" Criscitiello
Girls: Camilla Musso, Ilaria Pieri
25+: Facundo Gaston Gordillo (Withdrew), Jennifer Milan
Groups: Inquietude, Moka Stone

Contestants and categories
Key:
 – Winner
 – Runner-up
 – Third place

Live shows

Results summary
The number of votes received by each act will be released by Sky Italia after the final.

Colour key

Live show details

Week 1 (25 October)
Celebrity performers: Måneskin ("Torna a casa") and Rita Ora ("Let You Love Me")

Judges' votes to eliminate
 Agnelli: Matteo Costanzo - gave no reason.
 Guenzi: Matteo Costanzo - backed his own act, Red Bricks Foundation.
 Fedez: Red Bricks Foundation - backed his own act, Matteo Costanzo.
 Maionchi: Matteo Costanzo - gave no reason.

Week 2 (1 November)
Celebrity performers: Sting, Shaggy ("Gotta Get Back My Baby") and Dark Polo Gang ("Cambiare adesso")

Judges' votes to eliminate
 Guenzi: Emanuele Bertelli - backed his own act, Red Bricks Foundation.
 Maionchi: Red Bricks Foundation - backed her own act, Emanuele Bertelli.
 Fedez: Emanuele Bertelli - gave no reason.
 Agnelli: Red Bricks Foundation - could not decide so chose to take it to deadlock.

With the acts in the sing-off receiving two votes each, the result went to deadlock and a new public vote commenced for 200 seconds. Red Bricks Foundation was eliminated as the act with the fewest public votes.

Week 3 (8 November)
Celebrity performers: Fedez ("Prima di ogni cosa") and Sofi Tukker ("Batshit")

Judges' votes to eliminate
 Agnelli: Emanuele Bertelli - gave no reason.
 Guenzi: Emanuele Bertelli - backed his own act, Seveso Casino Palace.
 Fedez: Seveso Casino Palace - gave no reason.
 Maionchi: Seveso Casino Palace - backed her own act, Emanuele Bertelli.

With the acts in the sing-off receiving two votes each, the result went to deadlock and a new public vote commenced for 200 seconds. Emanuele Bertelli was eliminated as the act with the fewest public votes.

Week 4 (15 November)
Celebrity performers: Carl Brave feat. Max Gazzè ("Posso") and Gianna Nannini feat. Enrico Nigiotti ("Complici") 

Judges' votes to eliminate
 Fedez: Seveso Casino Palace - backed his own act, Naomi Rivieccio.
 Guenzi: Naomi Rivieccio - backed his own act, Seveso Casino Palace.
 Maionchi: Seveso Casino Palace - gave no reason.
 Agnelli: Naomi Rivieccio - could not decide so chose to take it to deadlock.

With the acts in the sing-off receiving two votes each, the result went to deadlock and a new public vote commenced for 200 seconds. Seveso Casino Palace was eliminated as the act with the fewest public votes.

Week 5 (22 November)
Celebrity performers: Subsonica ("Discolabirinto"/"Incantevole"/"Tutti i miei sbagli" and "Respirare") and Hooverphonic ("Romantic")

Judge's vote to eliminate
 Agnelli: Naomi Rivieccio - gave no reason.
 Guenzi: Renza Castelli - gave no reason.
 Fedez: Renza Castelli - gave no reason.
 Maionchi: Naomi Rivieccio - could not decide so chose to take it to deadlock.

With the acts in the sing-off receiving two votes each, the result was deadlocked and a new public vote commenced for 200 seconds. Renza Castelli was eliminated as the act with the fewest public votes.

Week 6: Quarter-final (29 November)

Judges' votes to eliminate
 Maionchi: Sherol dos Santos - backed her own act, Leo Gassmann.
 Agnelli: Leo Gassmann - backed his own act, Sherol dos Santos.
 Fedez: Sherol dos Santos - gave no reason.
 Guenzi: Leo Gassmann - could not decide so chose to take it to deadlock.

With the acts in the sing-off receiving two votes each, the result was deadlocked and a new public vote commenced for 200 seconds. Sherol dos Santos was eliminated as the act with the fewest public votes.

Week 7: Semi-final (6 December)

Judges' votes to eliminate
 Maionchi: Luna Melis - backed her own act, Leo Gassman.
 Agnelli: Leo Gassmann - backed his own act, Luna Melis.
 Fedez: Leo Gasmann - gave no reason
 Guenzi: Luna Melis - could not decide so chose to take it to deadlock.

With the acts in the sing-off receiving two votes each, the result was deadlocked and a new public vote commenced for 200 seconds. Leo Gassmann was eliminated as the act with the fewest public votes.

Week 8: Final (13 December)
Celebrity guest artists:  Marco Mengoni, Thegiornalisti, Muse, Ghali, Tom Walker

References

External links
 X Factor Italia

2018 Italian television seasons
Italian music television series
Italy 12
X Factor (Italian TV series)